Kiripaka is a locality in Northland, New Zealand. The settlement of Glenbervie lies to the southwest, and Ngunguru is to the northeast.

"Kiripaka" means flint, schist or asbestos in the Māori language.

Demographics

Kiripaka statistical area had a population of 993 at the 2018 New Zealand census, an increase of 105 people (11.8%) since the 2013 census, and an increase of 276 people (38.5%) since the 2006 census. There were 333 households, comprising 498 males and 495 females, giving a sex ratio of 1.01 males per female. The median age was 43.9 years (compared with 37.4 years nationally), with 228 people (23.0%) aged under 15 years, 114 (11.5%) aged 15 to 29, 513 (51.7%) aged 30 to 64, and 141 (14.2%) aged 65 or older.

Ethnicities were 85.2% European/Pākehā, 22.7% Māori, 3.3% Pacific peoples, 2.1% Asian, and 0.9% other ethnicities. People may identify with more than one ethnicity.

The percentage of people born overseas was 13.0, compared with 27.1% nationally.

Although some people chose not to answer the census's question about religious affiliation, 58.0% had no religion, 29.9% were Christian, 1.2% had Māori religious beliefs, 0.3% were Muslim, 0.3% were Buddhist and 2.4% had other religions.

Of those at least 15 years old, 168 (22.0%) people had a bachelor's or higher degree, and 114 (14.9%) people had no formal qualifications. The median income was $35,400, compared with $31,800 nationally. 156 people (20.4%) earned over $70,000 compared to 17.2% nationally. The employment status of those at least 15 was that 411 (53.7%) people were employed full-time, 132 (17.3%) were part-time, and 36 (4.7%) were unemployed.

Mining
A coal mine was opened at Kiripaka in 1893 and produced "first-class steam coal". A second mine was opened across the river in 1899. One of the mines closed in late 1904, as it was no longer profitable. The remaining mine was closed in 1912 in response to miners taking a day off to support the Waihi miners' strike. The mine reopened at the end of 1914 although coal output didn't begin until August 1915. After industrial disputes and flooding, the mine closed permanently in June 1921 although fire clay was extracted from 1923 and there was some further coal mining at the end of the decade.

Notes

Whangarei District
Populated places in the Northland Region